Erik Jonas Eriksson (born 21 December 1970) is a retired Swedish biathlon competitor who finished in 10th place in the 4×7.5 km relay at the 1998 Winter Olympics.

References

1970 births
Living people
Biathletes at the 1998 Winter Olympics
Swedish male biathletes
Olympic biathletes of Sweden
Sportspeople from Karlstad
20th-century Swedish people